Carlye J. Hughes is the eleventh and current bishop of the Episcopal Diocese of Newark. She was ordained as a bishop on September 22, 2018.

Early life and education 
Hughes, a native of Fort Worth, Texas, received a Bachelor of Arts in Drama from the University of Texas at Austin and worked as a corporate trainer for many years before attending seminary at the Virginia Theological Seminary, graduating in 2005. Hughes is currently a Doctor of Ministry student at the School of Theology of the University of the South in Sewanee, TN.

Ordained ministry 
Hughes was ordained in 2005. She served in a Lilly Fellowship at St. James' Episcopal Church in New York City, followed by five years as rector of St. Peter's Episcopal Church in Peekskill, New York. Trinity Episcopal Church in Fort Worth, Texas, called Hughes to serve as rector beginning in June 2013. Hughes is the first woman to serve as rector in the Episcopal Diocese of Fort Worth and the first African-American priest to serve in that parish.

Personal life 
Hughes is married to David Smedley and is the daughter of Coach Robert Hughes.

See also
 List of Episcopal bishops of the United States
 Historical list of the Episcopal bishops of the United States

References

External links 
Diocese of Newark elects XI Bishop

Living people
Episcopal bishops of Newark
American Episcopalians
Year of birth missing (living people)
Place of birth missing (living people)
Hughes